is a Japanese manga series, written by Seimaru Amagi and illustrated by Fumiya Satō (the creators of Kindaichi Case Files), originally serialized in Kodansha's Weekly Shōnen Magazine between May 2001 and July 2005, with its chapters collected in 22 tankōbon volumes. A 45-episode anime television series by Pierrot was broadcast on TBS from April 2003 to March 2004.

Plot
Detective School Q is the story of a group of young students from Class Q of Dan Detective School (DDS), a prestigious and renowned detective academy founded by Morihiko Dan, the most famous detective in Japan, and the adventures and mysteries they unfold and solve together. They eventually work against , a mysterious organization which creates almost fool-proof plans that only a handful of detectives can solve.

Characters

A bright, sweet and optimistic boy who is also a brilliant detective. He is considered to be Class Q's leader and is known for his logical explanations of cases. He has a good sense of judgment regarding people, as when everyone distrusted Ryū, he expressed his open appreciation for him. He seems to have a crush on Meg and he cares for her very much, although he enjoys teasing her.
Kyū had been a single child of a single parent (his mother) for as long as he could remember. However, a certain man had acted as his mentor when Kyū was little. When he was five years old, he was kidnapped and held as a hostage by some criminals but his mentor rescued him. In reality he was none other than Kyū's father, Satoru Renjō, Morihiko Dan's partner and right-hand man, who realizing the high risk of being a detective, married Kyū's mother in secret to keep his family safe. After Renjō's death, Kyū's mother hid the truth from Kyū for years, trying to shield him from the danger that the life of a detective is always in. After he was accepted in the DDS, Kyū's mother changed her mind and fully supported him.

Ryū is the grandson of King Hades, the founder and leader of Pluto, who had him sent to DDS. After his parents died, Pluto took care of Ryū. He has a mark of the organization on the back of his neck. As a child, Ryū was never allowed to socialize with others and so, viewed his house as more of a prison than a home. Ryū seems to have a cold personality, but he is still friendly with the other members of Class Q, and shares a special bond with Kyū, since he was the first one who could understand him. He admits that Kyū is a better detective than he is, despite Kyū's childish behavior, mentioning that tenacity and hard work are the factors that gives Kyū his edge over him.
For some reason, Ryū cannot remember his childhood, but is determined to find out anything he can. That Ryū is linked with Pluto is first discovered by Kyū, who keeps quiet about it, and even helps Ryū by trying to discover his past. Once the hypnosis which was blocking his memories is removed, Ryū starts remembering his past. The final lock on his memories is removed by King Hades himself, since he considered his plan as a failure, due to which Ryū remembers that his father is still alive and is reunited with him.

She has a big crush on both Kyū and Ryū. However Ryū is not interested in her, meanwhile Kyū enjoys teasing her (a trait usually seen in a boy who likes a particular girl). She studied in the Tokyo National Talent Development Research Center alongside Yutaka Saburōmaru. Meg lives with her older sister Akane, who attends a local university, as her parents work abroad.
The first time she sees Ryū, she feels that she has seen him somewhere, but cannot remember (which, she feels is odd, since she has photographic memory). Once her memories are unlocked, she remembers that both she and Ryū had studies at the Tokyo National Talent Development Research Center.

Kazuma is a rich, well known computer games programmer. He often helps find information through his laptop computer, which he carries around with him at all times. At first, after learning that he was a member of Class Q, which at the time was believed to be the lowest, he tried to get transferred to Class A. However, when his classmates came to his aid when he was in trouble, he changed his mind, preferring to stay with his friends. Kazuma has a friendly rivalry with Kinta due to their different approaches to detective work. Kazuma and Kinta are often the butt of each other's jokes. He is a prodigy, but he cannot get the right answers without his "lucky" hat, but he later seems to get over this flaw.

He now lives alone and works part-time in different jobs, going from one to another. Kinta is the strongest member of Class Q having had lessons in judo, kendo and karate. He also has superb senses, especially his eyesight and sense of smell. Kinta often mocks Kazuma's high tech approach to detective work, preferring instead to rely on his "instinct". His tough personality as well as his excellent senses have been very useful at times.

Dan is the founder and principal of DDS. He is a famous detective who has solved many cases, and is the only private detective in Japan licensed to hold a gun. Dan was a former police officer who resigned to open up a private detective company, Dan Detective Company (DDC), the parent company of DDS. He was assisted by a young boy named Satoru Renjō, who acted as his partner, assistant, and apprentice. Together they helped build DDC and DDS into a top level detective company and school (some of the top-level detectives at DDC and instructors at DDS were the first generation students of DDS).
Among many criminals they fought, the most powerful one was Pluto. Although Pluto was apparently destroyed, it was not without cost; Satoru was killed, and Dan was forced to be in a wheelchair for the rest of his life. Years later, there are signs that Pluto is being resurrected. Realizing that his days were numbered due to his old age, Dan decides to open a new, special class, Class Q, consisting of several extremely talented persons. He would train them, analyze each one of them, and appoint the best student of this class to be his successor.

The loyal assistant of Dan, she assisted Meg, Kyū and Kinta in getting admitted to DDS, having met them during a case.

DDS's head of forensics, Maki is both a skilled teacher and doctor, and is quite intelligent in his knowledge of medical and forensic science.

Nanami is another loyal righthand of Dan. He is very skilled in the art of disguise, and is often ordered by Dan to watch Class Q in cases by disguising as one of the suspects. Nanami is very carefree, as he loves to show his new tricks to Class Q, but he can be extremely serious when he needs to be. His favourite disguise is that of a cactus, which is also occasionally accompanied by a flashy, brightly patterned sombrero or Mexican outfit. He is usually assigned to look after Class Q especially when they discover the Pluto's hand behind the undertaken cases.

Saburōmaru is an arrogant Tokyo University student who enjoys boasting about his "superiority". He thinks that he will be a qualified detective. Although he has an IQ of 180, he seems too inept in solving mysteries. Saburōmaru is initially in Class A after joining DDS, but later gets demoted to Class B. He knows Meg via the Tokyo National Talent Development Research Center and has a crush on her older sister Akane.

King Hades is the founder and leader of Pluto. Ryū's grandfather and Dan's childhood friend. Hoshihiko is the illegitimate son of Takumi Kuzuryū, a multi-talented genius artist, and Yurika Kokuō, a genius criminal. When Hoshihiko's secret about his parentage was revealed, he was bullied by his classmates. Hoshihiko punished them by secretly putting a chemical substance in the bathroom that ignited fire, burning them in the process. He did it in such a fashion that the entire incident was considered an accident. Dan tried to convince Hoshihiko that he committed a crime, but Hoshihiko said that they cannot be friends anymore and walks away.
Takumi, fearing that Hoshihiko would harm his legitimate daughter, imprisoned him in the underground floor of the "House of Dragon", one of the buildings designed by him, which would be later DDS's first office and finally Class Q's classroom. In the underground room, where even light could not reach, Hoshihiko used a sharp stick to cut his face and used the blood to write a diary, which left him with two scars on his face. Hoshihiko, full of hopelessness and hatred, kills his father and manages to escape from the building, and later starts the Pluto organization. As King Hades, he tries to make Ryū feel the same hopelessness and betrayal from friends, so that he becomes a worthy successor. However, as this failed, he chooses death and remains behind in a burning house.

Media

Manga
Detective School Q, written by Seimaru Amagi and illustrated by Fumiya Satō, was serialized in Kodansha's Weekly Shōnen Magazine between May 23, 2001, to July 20, 2005. Kodansha collected its chapters in 22 tankōbon volumes, released from September 17, 2001, to October 17, 2005.

Anime

A 55-episode anime television series adaptation, animated by Pierrot and directed by Noriyuki Abe, was broadcast on TBS from April 15, 2003, to March 20, 2004. The episodes were collected in twelve DVD sets, released by Marvelous Entertainment between August 23, 2003, and July 24, 2004.

Drama
A two-hour special television drama adaptation was broadcast on Nippon TV on July 1, 2006. An eleven-episode television drama adaptation series was broadcast on Nippon TV from July 3 to September 11, 2007. The opening theme is "Answer" by Flow, while the ending theme was "Stand By Me" by the brilliant green.

Notes

References

External links
Pierrot's Official Website for Detective School Q
Animax Japan's website for Detective School Q
Animax East Asia's website for Detective School Q
Animax South Asia's website for Detective School Q
TBS's Website for Detective School Q

2003 anime television series debuts
2007 Japanese television series debuts
Anime series based on manga
Detective anime and manga
Kodansha manga
Mystery anime and manga
Nippon TV dramas
Pierrot (company)
School life in anime and manga
Shin Kibayashi
Shōnen manga
TBS Television (Japan) original programming